Epic commonly refers to:

 Epic poetry, a long narrative poem celebrating heroic deeds and events significant to a culture or nation
 Epic film, a genre of film with heroic elements

Epic or EPIC may also refer to:

Arts, entertainment, and media

Films
 Epic (1984 film)
 Epic (2013 film)

Gaming
 Epic (game), a series of wargames
 Epic (play-by-mail game)
 Epic (video game), a 1992 video game
 Epic: Battle for Moonhaven, a 2013 video game by Gameloft based on the film Epic (2013)
 Epic Card Game, a 2015 strategy card game by White Wizard Games

Literature
 Epic (Kostick novel), a 2004 novel by Conor Kostick
 Epic Illustrated, a 1980s anthology series published by Marvel Comics

Music

Albums
 Epic (Blood on the Dance Floor album), 2011
 Epic (Borknagar album), 2004
 Epic (R. Kelly album), 2010
 Epic (Sharon Van Etten album), 2010
 Epic (Tang Dynasty album), 1998

Songs
 "Epic" (Faith No More song), 1990
 "Epic" (Sandro Silva & Quintino song), 2011
 "Epic" (Big Time Rush song), 2011
 "Epic", a song by Sentenced from North from Here

Genres
 Epic fantasy, a subgenre of fantasy literature
 Epic trance, a subgenre of trance music

Other uses in arts, entertainment, and media
 Epic TV, an Indian Hindi-language TV channel
 Epic Comics, an imprint of Marvel Comics
 Epic Records, a record label subsidiary of Sony

Brands and enterprises
 Epic, a telecommunications company owned by Monaco Telecom
 Epic (Cyprus), a telecommunications provider in Cyprus, formerly MTN Cyprus
 Epic (Malta), a telecommunications provider in Malta, formerly Vodafone Malta
 Epic Aircraft, an aircraft manufacturer in Bend, Oregon
Epic Games, an American video game company
 Epic Systems, a healthcare software company in Verona, Wisconsin
 Epics (company), a Japanese video game developer
 Red Epic, a motion picture camera produced by Red Digital Cinema

Organizations
 Education for Peace in Iraq Center, a charitable organization located in Washington, D.C.
 El Paso Intelligence Center, a Drug Enforcement Agency building in El Paso, Texas
 Electors Photo Identity Card, the standard form of voter ID in India
 Electronic Privacy Information Center, an independent non-profit research center
 End Poverty in California, a political movement led by Upton Sinclair
 Établissement public à caractère industriel et commercial, a type of public-sector body in France and other countries
 European Photonics Industry Consortium, an association of photonics companies based in Paris
 Epic Energy, owner and operator of gas pipelines in South Australia

Places
 EPIC The Irish Emigration Museum, located in Dublin's Docklands
 Epic Residences & Hotel, a skyscraper in Downtown Miami completed in 2008
 East Plano Islamic Center, or EPIC Masjid, a mosque located in Plano, Texas
 Eastside Preparatory Impact Center, a building focused on sustainability at Eastside Preparatory School, Kirkland, Washington
 Energy Production and Infrastructure Center, at the University of North Carolina at Charlotte
 Exhibition Park in Canberra, a large showground and multi-building venue in Australia

Technology
 EPIC (form factor), a single-board computer form factor based on the PC/104
 EPIC Express, an EPIC board with PCI Express capability
 Epic (web browser)
 Epic, a large user story in software development and product management
 Earth Polychromatic Imaging Camera, an earth-facing camera in the Deep Space Climate Observatory satellite
 Electromagnetic Personal Interdiction Control
 Embedded Programmable Interrupt Controller
 EPICS, a software environment for distributed control systems
 Evolutionary Process for Integrating COTS-Based Systems
 Explicitly parallel instruction computing, a CPU architecture design philosophy

Other uses
 Ecliptic Plane Input Catalog, a database of stars and planets
 Epic Mazur (born 1970), an American rapper
 EPIC, the term for a ticker symbol in the United Kingdom prior to 1996
 Epic morphism, or epimorphism, a mathematical concept
 European Prospective Investigation into Cancer and Nutrition, a Europe-wide cohort study of diet and cancer
 Norwegian Epic, a cruise ship
 Excellence in Prehospital Injury Care, a program at the University of Arizona College of Medicine – Tucson

See also
 EPCI, or Engineering, Procurement, Installation and Commissioning, a construction-industry contract
 Eipic (disambiguation)
 Epica (disambiguation)
 Epik (disambiguation)
 Epix (disambiguation)
 Epoch (disambiguation)
 The Epic (disambiguation)